The Mokole languages are a small group of Mande languages of Guinea and Sierra Leone. They are Kakabe, Kuranko, Lele, and Mixifore.

References

Mande languages
Languages of Guinea
Languages of Sierra Leone